Thinking machine or thinking machines may refer to:

 Thinking Machines Corporation, defunct supercomputer manufacturer, in business from 1982 to 1994
 Thinking machines (Dune), fictional intelligent robots from the Dune universe created by Frank Herbert in 1965
 Professor Augustus S. F. X. Van Dusen, fictional detective known as "The Thinking Machine" in two 1900s novels and a series of detective short stories by Jacques Futrelle

See also 
 Artificial intelligence